Jonathan Tchamwa Tchatchoua (born 21 April 1999) is a Cameroonian college basketball player for the Baylor Bears of the Big 12 Conference. He previously played for the UNLV Runnin' Rebels.

Early life and career
Tchatchoua grew up playing association football before switching to basketball at age 16. In 2015, he took part in a local camp held by Luc Mbah a Moute and was later invited to a Basketball Without Borders camp in Johannesburg. Two years later, Tchatchoua joined the NBA Global Academy in Australia, where he began learning English. He committed to playing college basketball in the United States for UNLV over offers from Gonzaga and St. John's.

College career
As a freshman at UNLV, Tchatchoua averaged 3.4 points and 3.5 rebounds per game. After the season, he transferred to Baylor and sat out for one year due to transfer rules. Tchatchoua was nicknamed "Everyday Jon" by his teammates due to his work ethic. As a sophomore, he earned Big 12 All-Newcomer Team honors. Tchatchoua averaged 6.4 points and five rebounds per game on a team that won a national title. He scored a career-high 21 points on 9 February 2022, in a 75–60 win against Kansas State. On 12 February 2022, Tchatchoua suffered a knee injury during a 80–63 win over Texas. An MRI revealed damage to multiple ligaments, and he underwent season-ending surgery. As a junior, he averaged 8.4 points and 6.8 rebounds per game and won Big 12 Co-Defensive Player of the Year, alongside Oklahoma State's Moussa Cissé and West Virginia's Gabe Osabuohien.

Career statistics

College

|-
| style="text-align:left;"| 2018–19
| style="text-align:left;"| UNLV
| 31 || 11 || 13.3 || .475 || .000 || .682 || 3.5 || .2 || .2 || .7 || 3.4
|-
| style="text-align:left;"| 2019–20
| style="text-align:left;"| Baylor
| style="text-align:center;" colspan="11"|  Redshirt
|-
| style="text-align:left;"| 2020–21
| style="text-align:left;"| Baylor
| 29 || 0 || 19.3 || .576 || – || .773 || 5.0 || .4 || .5 || .7 || 6.4
|-
| style="text-align:left;"| 2021–22
| style="text-align:left;"| Baylor
| 25 || 0 || 20.8 || .677 || .462 || .771 || 6.8 || .7 || .7 || .4 || 8.4
|- class="sortbottom"
| style="text-align:center;" colspan="2"| Career
| 85 || 11 || 17.5 || .591 || .375 || .740 || 5.0 || .4 || .5 || .6 || 5.9

References

External links
Baylor Bears bio
UNLV Runnin' Rebels bio

1999 births
Living people
Basketball players from Yaoundé
Baylor Bears men's basketball players
Cameroonian expatriate basketball people in the United States
Cameroonian men's basketball players
Power forwards (basketball)
UNLV Runnin' Rebels basketball players